Polychrus is the only extant genus of polychrotid lizards in the world.  Commonly called bush anoles, they are found in Central and South America, as well as nearby Trinidad and Tobago.

Polychrus means "many colored". True anoles in other genera are now placed in Dactyloidae.  Polychrus is presently in the family Polychrotidae.

Species

Polychrus acutirostris Spix, 1825 – Brazilian bush anole
Polychrus auduboni Hallowell, 1845 – Many-colored bush anole 
Polychrus femoralis Werner, 1910 – Werner's bush anole
Polychrus gutturosus  Berthold, 1845 – Berthold's bush anole
Polychrus jacquelinae Koch, Venegas, Garcia-Bravo, and Böhme, 2011 - Jacquelin's bush anole
Polychrus liogaster  Boulenger, 1908 – Boulenger's bush anole
Polychrus marmoratus  Linnaeus, 1758 – Many-colored Bush Anole, Common monkey lizard
Polychrus peruvianus Noble, 1924 - Peruvian bush anole

Fossil history
Though species of Polychrus have an almost exclusively South American distribution today, a stem representative, Sauropithecoides charisticus, was reported from the late Eocene of North Dakota, USA.

References

Further reading
Berthold, A. A. 1845. "Über verschiedene neue oder seltene Reptilien aus Neu-Granada und Crustaceen aus China". Nachr. Georg-Augustus-Univ. und königl. Ges. Wiss. Göttingen 3: 37-48.
Boulenger, G. A. 1908. "Descriptions of new South American reptiles". Ann. Mag. Nat. Hist., Ser. 8, 1 (1): 111−115.
Koch, C., Venegas, P.J., Garcia-Bravo, A. & Böhme, W. 2011. "A new bush anole (Iguanidae: Polychrotinae: Polychrus) from the upper Marañon basin, Peru, with a redescription of Polychrus peruvianus (Noble, 1924) and additional information on P. gutturosus Berthold, 1845". ZooKeys 141: 79−107.
Linnaeus, C. 1758. "Systema Naturae per Regna tria Naturae, secundum Classes, Ordines, Genera, Species, cum characteribus, differentiis, synonymus, locis. Ed. 10. Tomus I. – Salvius, Stockholm, 824 pp.
Noble, G. K. 1924. "New lizards from northwestern Peru". Occasional Papers of the Boston Society of Natural History 5: 107−113.
Schlüter, U. 2013. "Buntleguane - Lebensweise, Pflege, Fortpflanzung". KUS-Verlag, Rheinstetten, 78 pp. (A Monograph on Polychrus)
Spix, J. B. von 1825. "Animalia nova sive species novae lacertarum,quas in itinere per Brasiliam annis MDCCCXVII-MDCCCXX jussu et auspiciis Maximiliani Josephi I. Bavariae regis". F. S. Hübschmann, München, pp. 1−26.
Werner, F. 1910. "Über neue oder seltene Reptilien des Naturhistorischen Museums in Hamburg. II. Eidechsen". Mitt. Naturhist. Mus. Hamburg 27 (2): 1−46.

Polychrotidae
Lizard genera
Lizards of Central America
Lizards of the Caribbean
Lizards of South America
Taxa named by Georges Cuvier